Aviateca Flight 901 was a Boeing 737-200 (registration N125GU) that crashed into the  San Vicente volcano in El Salvador on approach to the airport on 9 August 1995. The accident killed all 65 passengers and crew on board. It was the deadliest aviation disaster to occur in El Salvador.

Accident
Aviateca Flight 901 took off on a nighttime flight from La Aurora International Airport in Guatemala City, Guatemala, to El Salvador International Airport in San Salvador, El Salvador. There were 58 passengers and 7 crew on board. The flight crew consisted of 39-year-old Captain Axel Byron Herrera, 36-year-old First Officer Victor Francesco Salguero, three Flight Attendants and two Aviateca staffers.

After a 20-minute flight the crew of Flight 901 contacted air traffic control at their destination, El Salvador International Airport. The controller informed them that there was a thunderstorm with heavy rain over the airport and instructed them to fly over the storm and start their approach downwind to land on Runway 07. But the pilots and air traffic control were confused as to the position of the aircraft as it started its approach, and the aircraft entered the same bad weather that it had flown over. When it was at 5,000 feet (1,524 m), the Ground Proximity Warning System sounded; power was applied but it was too late. At 20:14 local time Flight 901 crashed into the side of the volcano San Vicente and burst into flames. All 65 passengers and crew on board were killed. Two passengers left the plane before taking off: Jean B Dupoux, a French American, and Eishen a German.

Cause
The Dirección General De Transporte Aéreo determined that the probable cause of the accident was the flight crew's lack of situational awareness in relation to the 7,159-foot obstruction, the flight crew's decision to descend below the MSA while deviating from a published transition or approach, and the ambiguity of position information between the flight crew and the air traffic controller, which resulted in the controller's issuance of an altitude assignment that did not provide terrain clearance. Contributing to the accident was the failure of the First Officer to direct his concern regarding reported positions to the Captain in a more direct and assertive manner and the failure of the controller to recognize the aircraft's reported position relative to obstructions and give appropriate instructions and warnings. An ineffective crew resource management program at Aviateca was held to have contributed to the accident.

See also

Air New Zealand Flight 901-- a flight with the same number that also crashed into a volcano.
Prinair Flight 277
American Airlines Flight 965
Air China Flight 129

References

External links
GRAPHIC Scene of the crash site of Flight 901 from Associated Press Archive

Aviation accidents and incidents in 1995
Accidents and incidents involving the Boeing 737 Original
Avianca Guatemala accidents and incidents
1995 in El Salvador
August 1995 events in North America
Airliner accidents and incidents involving controlled flight into terrain
Airliner accidents and incidents caused by weather
Airliner accidents and incidents caused by pilot error
Aviation accidents and incidents caused by air traffic controller error